Sm'Aesch Pfeffingen is a Swiss women's professional volleyball team based in Pfeffingen, Basel-Landschaft.

The team plays in the Swiss Women's Volleyball League.

Titles
Swiss Supercup
 2020

Notable players
To appear in this section a player must have either:
– Set a club record or won an individual award as a professional player.
– Played at least one official international match for his senior national team at any time.
 Méline Pierret
 Luna Bečić

References

2000 establishments in Switzerland
Basel-Landschaft
Swiss volleyball clubs
Volleyball clubs established in 2000